Athletics competitions at the 2006 Micronesian Games were held at the Oleai Sports Complex in Susupe, Saipan, Northern Mariana Islands, between June 24 - July 1, 2006.

A total of 44 events were contested, 22 by men and 22 by women.

Medal summary
Medal winners and their results were published on the webpages of Athletics Weekly webpage courtesy of Tony Isaacs, and of the Oceania Athletics Association.

Men

Women

Medal table (unofficial)

References

External links
 Athletics at the 2006 Micronesian Games

Athletics at the Micronesian Games
Athletics in the Northern Mariana Islands
Micronesian Games
2006 in Northern Mariana Islands sports